Bench people (also known as Gimira), are an Omotic-speaking people indigenous to southwestern Ethiopia. According to the 2007 census there are 353,526 Bench people in Ethiopia, making up 0.48% of the country's total population Bench are among the major ethnic groups inhabiting the Bench Maji Zone in the Southern Nations, Nationalities and Peoples' Region (SNNPR), and the majority live in the former district of Bench, which was divided into Debub Bench, Semien Bench, and She Bench districts. Bench language is the ancestral language of Bench people and belongs to the Northern Omotic languages.

Economy 
Bench people are subsistence farmers who cultivate maize, sorghum, and root crops such as taro and yam as their major staple crops, though coffee and Ethiopian cardamom are also cultivated as the main cash crops. In some highland areas, Bench people cultivate barley, wheat, beans, peas and teff. According to Bench District Administration Office Bench also raise cattle, sheep, goats, equine and poultry.

References 

Omotic-speaking peoples
Ethnic groups in Ethiopia